Miss Île-de-France is a French beauty pageant which selects a representative for the Miss France national competition from the region of Île-de-France. Women representing the region under various different titles have competed at Miss France since 1930, although the Miss Île-de-France title was not used regularly until 1984.

The current Miss Île-de-France is Adèle Bonnamour, who was crowned Miss Île-de-France 2022 on 22 October 2022. Sixteen women from Île-de-France have been crowned Miss France, the most of any region:
Jacqueline Bertin-Lequien, who was crowned Miss France 1933, competing as Miss Paris
Simone Barillier, who was crowned Miss France 1934, competing as Miss Paris
Gisèle Préville, who was crowned Miss France 1935, competing as Miss Paris, following the resignation of the original winner
Ginette Catriens, who was crowned Miss France 1939
Jacqueline Donny, who was crowned Miss France 1948, competing as Miss Paris
Juliette Figueras, who was crowned Miss France 1949, competing as Miss Paris
Maryse Delort, who was crowned Miss France 1950, competing as Miss Paris
Véronique Zuber, who was crowned Miss France 1955, competing as Miss Paris
Muguette Fabris, who was crowned Miss France 1963 
Michelle Beaurain, who was crowned Miss France 1970, competing as Miss Paris
Chantal Bouvier de Lamotte, who was crowned Miss France 1972, competing as Miss Paris, and later resigned
Brigitte Konjovic, who was crowned Miss France 1978, competing as Miss Paris, following the resignation of the original winner
Isabelle Turpault, who was crowned Miss France 1983, competing as Miss Paris, and later dethroned
Valérie Pascale, who was crowned Miss France 1986, competing as Miss Paris
Patricia Spehar, who was crowned Miss France 1997, competing as Miss Paris
Diane Leyre, who was crowned Miss France 2022

Results summary
Miss France: Jacqueline Bertin-Lequien (1933; Miss Paris); Simone Barillier (1934; Miss Paris); Ginette Catriens (1939); Jacqueline Donny (1947; Miss Paris); Juliette Figueras (1948; Miss Paris); Maryse Delort (1949; Miss Paris); Véronique Zuber (1954; Miss Paris); Muguette Fabris (1962); Michelle Beaurain (1969; Miss Paris); Chantal Bouvier de Lamotte (1971; Miss Paris; resigned); Isabelle Turpault (1982; Miss Paris; dethroned); Valérie Pascale (1985; Miss Paris); Patricia Spehar (1996; Miss Paris); Diane Leyre (2021)
1st Runner-Up: Gisèle Préville (1935; Miss Paris; later Miss France); Pierrette Frauen (1946; Miss Paris); Danielle Génault (1953); Gisèle Gallois (1957); Brigitte Konjovic (1977; Miss Paris; later Miss France); Pamela Semmache (1998; Miss Paris); Ornella Verrechia (2002); Sophie Ducasse (2005)
2nd Runner-Up: Josiane Bouffenie (1973; Miss Val-de-Marne); Frédérique Laffond (1976); Lison Di Martino (2017)
3rd Runner-Up: Muriel Sellier (1981); Amélie Kervran (2004; Miss Paris); Krystel Norden (2006; Miss Paris)
4th Runner-Up: Chantal Braham (1978; Miss Paris); Béatrice Burié (1979; Miss Paris); Isabelle Da Silva (1993; Miss Paris); Sabine Hossenbaccus (2010)
5th Runner-Up: Christine Vogel (1986)
6th Runner-Up: Françoise Bocci (1976; Miss Paris); Julie-Chloé Mougeolle (2003; Miss Paris); Alice Quérette (2018); Lara Lourenço (2020)
Top 12/Top 15: Sophie Rousseau (1986; Miss Paris); Nathalie Nicolov (1987); Karine Bohin (1989); Delphine Vignay (1990); Marie-Christine Prudhomme (1991; Miss Paris); Agnès Boudou (1994; Miss Paris); Lætitia La Spina (1997; Miss Paris); Fany Trueba (1998); Céline Lambert (1999; Miss Paris); Émilie François (2001); Isabelle Lamant (2002; Miss Paris); Rebecca Andry (2006); Cyrielle Roidot (2007; Miss Paris); Margaux Savarit (2014); Meggy Pyaneeandee (2016); Évelyne de Larichaudy (2019)

Titleholders

Miss Essonne
In 1972 and 1976, the department of Essonne crowned its own representative for Miss France.

Miss Hauts-de-Seine
In 1979, the department of Hauts-de-Seine crowned its own representative for Miss France.

Miss Nogeantais
In 1979, the department of Val-de-Marne crowned its own representative for Miss France under the title Miss Nogeantais.

Miss Paris
From the 1930s to 2000s, the city of Paris crowned its own representative for Miss France.

Miss Seine-et-Marne
In 1976, 1977, and 1978, the department of Seine-et-Marne crowned its own representative for Miss France.

Miss Seine-Saint-Denis
In 1979, the department of Seine-Saint-Denis crowned its own representative for Miss France.

Miss Val-d'Oise
In 1967 and 1979, the department of Val-d'Oise crowned its own representative for Miss France.

Miss Val-de-Marne
In 1972, 1973, and 1979, the department of Val-de-Marne crowned its own representative for Miss France.

Miss Yvelines
In 1977, the department of Yvelines crowned its own representative for Miss France.

Notes

References

External links

Miss France regional pageants
Beauty pageants in France
Women in France